In mathematics, the dual module of a left (respectively right) module M over a ring R is the set of module homomorphisms from M to R with the pointwise right (respectively left) module structure.

If the base ring R is a field, then a dual module is a dual vector space.

Every module has a canonical homomorphism to the dual of its dual (called the double dual). A reflexive module is one for which the canonical homomorphism is an isomorphism. A torsionless module is one for which the canonical homomorphism is injective.

Example: If  is a finite commutative group scheme represented by a Hopf algebra A over a commutative ring k, then the Cartier dual  is the Spec of the dual k-module of A.

References

Module theory